Highworth is a mix-use locality in the Sunshine Coast Region, Queensland, Australia.

Geography
The locality has an area of residential development, an extension of the suburban development of neighbouring Nambour. The rest of the locality is used for agriculture, predominantly grazing on native vegetation.

History 
The locality is believed to be named after the town Highworth in England.

Highworth Provisional School opened on 27 May 1901. It became Highworth State School on 1 January 1909. It closed on 15 August 1932.

In the  Highworth had a population of 307 people.

Education 
There are no schools in Highworth. The nearest primary school is Burnside State School in neighbouring Burnside to the south. The nearest secondary school is Burnside State High School also in Burnside.

References

Suburbs of the Sunshine Coast Region
Localities in Queensland